The 1950 World Table Tennis Championships men's singles was the 17th edition of the men's singles championship. 

Richard Bergmann defeated Ferenc Soos in the final, winning three sets to two to secure the title.

Results

See also
List of World Table Tennis Championships medalists

References

-